Neorudolphia is a genus of flowering plants in the family Fabaceae. It belongs to the subfamily Faboideae. Neorudolphia is monotypic, the only species is Neorudolphia volubilis.

References

Phaseoleae
Monotypic Fabaceae genera